The Iron Claw (1941) was the 15th serial released by Columbia Pictures .

Synopsis
A Fortune in gold, taken from the wreck of a Spanish galleon, is hidden in the home of Anton Benson, a reclusive miser.  The entire Benson family and household want the gold for themselves, including a mystery villain known as the Iron Claw. Newspaper journalist Bob Lane, with his photographer Jack Strong and Benton's niece Patricia, attempt to get to the bottom of the mystery.

Cast

Chapter titles
 The Shaft of Doom
 The Murderous Mirror
 The Drop of Destiny
 The Fatal Fuse
 The Fiery Fall
 The Ship Log Talks
 The Mystic Map
 The Perilous Pit
 The Cul-de-sac
 The Curse of the Cave
 The Doctor's Bargain
 Vapors of Evil
 The Secret Door
 The Evil Eye
 The Claw's Collapse
Source:

References

External links
 
 
 Cinefania.com

1941 films
1940s English-language films
American black-and-white films
Columbia Pictures film serials
Films directed by James W. Horne
1940s crime films
American crime films
Films with screenplays by George H. Plympton
1940s American films